The 2022 SAFF U-15 Women's Championship was the 4th edition of SAFF U-15 Women's Championship, the association football tournament for women's national team under the age of 15 and it organised by South Asian Football Federation. Its was  held from 1–11 November 2022 in Bangladesh.

Nepal is the defending champion having won the 2022 title for the finished top of the league table.

Host selection
South Asian Football Federation (SAFF) have announced  on 5 October 2022 that Bangladesh is the host of the tournament.

Venue
All matches will be held at the BSSS Mostafa Kamal Stadium in Dhaka, Bangladesh.

Player eligibility
All players born on or after 1 January 2007 are eligible to participate in the tournament.

Match Officials

Referees
 Jaya Chakma
 Kanika Barman
 Usha Bhainsora

Assistant Referees
 Reshme Thapa Chettri
 Salma Akter Moni
 Soni Akanksha

Participating nations
The following three teams will participate in this edition.

Tournament format
Double round-robin, each team will play each other twice. Champion will determine with team have a best result.

League table

Standing

Matches
All times at local (UTC+6)

Awards

Statistics

Goalscorers

See also
2022 SAFF Women's Championship
2022 SAFF U-18 Women's Championship

References

2022
2022 in women's association football
2022 in Asian football